Zygmunt Milewski (3 February 1934 – 31 December 2002) was a Polish boxer. He competed in the men's lightweight event at the 1956 Summer Olympics.

References

1934 births
2002 deaths
Polish male boxers
Olympic boxers of Poland
Boxers at the 1956 Summer Olympics
People from the Free City of Danzig
Sportspeople from Gdańsk
Lightweight boxers